Kristian Langlo (3 May 1894 – 20 October 1976) was a Norwegian politician for the Liberal Party.

He was born in Stranda.

He was elected to the Norwegian Parliament from the Market towns of Møre og Romsdal in 1950, and was later re-elected on one occasion (in 1961).

Langlo held various positions in Ålesund city council from 1931 to 1934 and 1945 to 1955, serving as mayor in the period 1947–1949.

References

1894 births
1976 deaths
Liberal Party (Norway) politicians
Members of the Storting
20th-century Norwegian politicians
People from Stranda